Everybody's Crazy is the fourth studio album by American recording artist Michael Bolton. The album was released in 1985 by Columbia Records.

The lead guitarist on the album is Bruce Kulick, later of KISS fame. The title track was a minor hit on hard rock radio stations, and was also featured in the 1986 movie Back to School. It was reissued overseas in the mid-1990s with a then-current photo on the cover. The album was reissued on February 25, 2008 by Rock Candy Records, UK on CD with a 12-page full colour booklet with original and new artwork.

Given the contrast in musical style between this album and the majority of Bolton's later (and more successful) musical output, songs from the album rarely appear on Bolton compilations.  However, the title track was included on Bolton's entry in the Playlist series of Greatest Hits compilations.

Background
Producer Neil Kernon described how he became involved with the album: "Well, I got a call from Michael's manager asking me if I'd be interested. I'd heard "Fools Game" [from his previous album, Michael Bolton] and liked that, so we met and hit it off straight away. Michael was one of the funniest people I've ever met." Kernon also said that later on, Bolton did not want to re-release Everybody's Crazy or his self titled 1983 album on CD for fear of confusing and alienating fans of his later adult contemporary music.

Reception

In their retrospective review, AllMusic criticized Everybody's Crazy for muting Bolton's distinctive vocals, remarking that "much of the time he seemed to be fighting to be heard, and when he was, all he had was a mouthful of cliches to offer."

The album has an average rating of 88/100 on the hard rock/AOR database Heavy Harmonies.

Track listing

Personnel 
 Michael Bolton – lead vocals, backing vocals, additional guitar, arrangements (1, 3, 5)
 Bruce Kulick – lead guitar (1-5, 7, 8, 9)
 Dennis Feldman – bass, backing vocals
 Lloyd Landesman – keyboards
 Mark Mangold – keyboards, arrangements (1, 3, 5)
 Jan Mullaney – keyboards
 Mark Radice – keyboards
 Allan St. John – keyboards
 Chuck Burgi – drums (uncredited on the original release, but credited in the reissue)
 Mark Rivera – saxophone
 Larry Fast – synthesizer programming
 Schuyler Deale – additional bass
 Doug Katsaros – additional keyboards
 Neil Kernon – additional keyboards
 Terry Brock – backing vocals
 Peppy Castro – backing vocals
 Joe Cerisano – backing vocals
 Randy Goodrum – keyboards, synthesizer programming, drum programming, backing vocals (all on 6 only)
 Kevin Dukes – guitar (6)
 Paul Pesco – additional guitar (6)

Production 
 Producers – Neil Kernon (Tracks 1–5, 7, 8 & 9); Randy Goodrum (Track 6)
 Co-Producer – Michael Bolton (Tracks 1–5, 7, 8 & 9)
 Executive Producer – Louis Levin
 Engineers – John Abbey, Bruce Buchalter, Bobby Cohen, John Davenport, Neil Kernon, Bruce Lampcov, Andrew Milano and Malcolm Pollack.
 Additional Engineer on Track 6  – Larold Rebhun
 Assistant Engineers on Track 6 – Michael Sommers-Abbott and Paul Ericksen.
 Recorded at The Power Station, Electric Lady Studios and Delta Recording Studios (New York, NY).
 Additional Overdubs on Track 6 engineered by Jay Graydon at Garden Rake Studios (Sherman Oaks, CA).
 Tracks 1, 2, 3, 5, 7, 8 & 9 mixed by Neil Kernon.
 Track 4 mixed by Bobby Cohen, Jan Mullaney and Michael Bolton at The Hit Factory (New York, NY).
 Track 6 mixed by Elliot Scheiner at Soundcastle (Los Angeles, CA).
 Mastered by Bob Ludwig at Masterdisk (New York, NY).
 Studio Maintenance – Bruce Friedman
 Direction – Louis Levin, in association with David Krebs and Steve Leber for Contemporary Communications Corporation
 Photography – Randee St. Nicholas
 Stylist – Fleur Thiemeyer

Music videos

Cover versions
 Starship covered "Desperate Heart" for their 1985 album Knee Deep in the Hoopla.
 Jennifer Rush covered "Call My Name" (with slightly altered lyrics, thus earning Rush a co-writing credit on her version) for her 1987 album Heart Over Mind.

References

External links
Everybody's Crazy at Discogs

Michael Bolton albums
1985 albums
Albums produced by Neil Kernon
Columbia Records albums